Saint Joan is a 1967 American TV film adaptation of the 1923 George Bernard Shaw play Saint Joan for the Hallmark Hall of Fame. It was directed by George Schaefer.

The cast was announced August 1967. Geneviève Bujold played the title role. Taping took place over four weeks.

Cast
Theodore Bikel as Robert de Baudricourt
David Birney as Ladvenu
Geneviève Bujold as Saint Joan of Arc
James Daly as Jack Dunois
John Devlin as Poulengry
James Donald as Richard Warwick
Dana Elcar as La Hire
Maurice Evans as Bishop Cauchon
Chris Gampel as The Executioner
Leo Genn as Archbishop of Rheims
William Hickey as The Steward
William LeMassena as D'Estivet
Michael Lewis as La Teremouille
Ian Martin as English Soldier
Raymond Massey as The Inquisitor 
Roddy McDowall as Charles, The Dauphin
George Rose as Chaplain de Stogumber
Ted van Griethuysen as Bluebeard

Reception
The production was well received, with one critic calling it "wonderfully good" and another calling it "absorbing and exciting".

References

External links
Audio transcript of production at Internet Archive

1967 television films
1967 films
Films directed by George Schaefer
American films based on plays
American historical films
1967 drama films
1960s historical films
Films based on works by George Bernard Shaw
Films about Joan of Arc
Hallmark Hall of Fame episodes
American drama television films
1960s English-language films
1960s American films